Mitochondrial fission factor (Mff) is a protein that in humans is encoded by the MFF gene. Its primary role is in controlling the division of mitochondria. It has also been shown to regulate peroxisome morphology.

Role in mitochondrial fission

Mff is an outer mitochondrial membrane protein that binds to the GTPase Drp1; the Mff-Drp1 complex is what promotes mitochondrial fission. Knockdown of Mff causes the mitochondrial network to expand (by releasing the Drp1 foci from the outer mitochondrial membrane), while Mff overexpression causes it to become fragmented (by stimulating mitochondrial recruitment of Drp1).

References

Further reading 

 

Mitochondria